Mahwa may refer to:

 Mahwa tree, a plant
 Mahwa, Rajasthan, a town in India
 Mahwa, Iran, a village in Kerman Province, Iran

See also
 Mahuwa (disambiguation)
 Mahuva (disambiguation)